Crow Holdings is a privately owned real estate investment and development firm based in Dallas, Texas, US, which has been operating since 1948. Originally founded by Trammell Crow, the firm was expanded under the direction of his son, Harlan Crow, Chairman and former CEO. As of 2018, the company employed 450 people through its operating businesses in locations throughout the US. As of 2020, Crow Holdings managed $19.6 billion.

Business 
Founder Trammell Crow began developing real estate at the end of World War II. Since then, Crow Holdings has been an active investor and/or developer in industrial, multifamily, office, retail, mart, land and hotel real estate businesses in the US, Europe and South America. Crow Holdings also holds stakes in privately held businesses and other financial assets.

Crow Holdings companies include: Crow Holdings Capital, Trammell Crow Residential, Crow Holdings Industrial and Crow Holdings Office, and maintains a broad portfolio of investments including various signature properties including Old Parkland office campus, the Anatole Hotel, the Dallas Market Center, The Brussels Trade Mart and The Windsor Court Hotel in New Orleans.

Crow Holdings Capital 
Crow Holdings Capital is an investment management company of Crow Holdings. It was registered in 2011 as a Registered Investment Advisor to continue Crow Holdings private equity real estate fund business which was launched in 1998 with a $281 million fund. As of 2018 Crow Holdings Capital managed $10 billion AUM.

Trammel Crow Residential 
Trammell Crow Residential is the multifamily real estate development company of Crow Holdings. Founded in 1978, TCR develops multifamily real estate projects in major markets across the U.S. During its 40-year history it has built over 275,000 multifamily residences. In 1997 TCR was the largest builder of apartments in the US. TCR has been ranked one of the top ten largest apartment developers in the U.S. in 2014, 2015, 2016, 2017, 2018 and 2019.

Crow Holdings Industrial 
Crow Holdings Industrial was launched in 2013 to develop industrial facilities such as distribution, fulfillment, and last-mile logistics centers. Since 2013 it has developed about 60 properties and 23 million square-feet of industrial space for companies such as Amazon, Whole Foods, LG, and Williams Sonoma.  During the fourth quarter of 2019 it had 8 million square-feet under construction and $275 million in property sales.

In 2016 CHI opened an office in Southern California, and in 2018 opened additional offices to cover the Midwest and Northeast of the United States.

CHI is committed to the use of green warehouse standards, using green and recycled construction materials whenever possible, and the installation of LED lighting and EV car charging stations is typical of CHI projects.

Crow Holdings Office 
Crow Holdings Office (CHO), launched in January 2020, designs and builds office projects throughout the US.

History

1948-1979
Trammell Crow built his first warehouse in Dallas, Texas in 1948, forming the Trammell Crow Company (TCC). From its founding through the 1980s, TCC’s primary business was the development and management of industrial, office and retail projects.

By 1971, Trammell Crow was the biggest private landlord in the USA, with over $1 billion in real estate. In 1976 and 1977 the company re-organized into three separate but connected entities: the Trammell Crow Company for commercial development; the Trammell Crow Residential Companies for residential development; and Crow Family Holdings, which included the Dallas Market Center, warehouses and hotels. Trammell Crow held the position of CEO until 1977.

1980s
In 1982 Trammell Crow Interests was established. TCI was headed by Trammell's son, Harlan Crow. TCI is the predecessor of Crow Holdings. By 1984 Trammell Crow was the biggest real estate developer in the U.S., with 140 million square feet of property in 73 cities.

1990s
In 1997 the Trammell Crow Company went public, trading shares on the New York Stock Exchange. At the time, TCC was one of the largest diversified commercial real estate services companies and the largest commercial property manager in the US.

In 1998 Crow Family Holdings dropped “family” from the name of the private holding company.

2000s
In 2006 Trammell Crow Company was sold to the CB Richard Ellis Group.

Management team
Harlan Crow was CEO of Crow Holdings until 2017, remaining as chairman of the board. Anne Raymond was managing director of Crow Holdings until 2017 and is a member of the board. Michael Levy became CEO of Crow Holdings in November, 2017. Ken Valach is the CEO of Trammell Crow Residential and Crow Holdings Industrial. Bob McClain is CEO and head of the Real Estate Investment Committee for Crow Holdings Capital.

Selected properties

Old Parkland 
Parkland Hospital was built in 1894, but fell into disrepair after the hospital relocated in 1954.In 2006 Crow Holdings redeveloped the property to office space, renaming it Old Parkland. In 2009 the company moved its headquarters into the renovated building.

Windsor Court Hotel 
In 2009 the company purchased the luxury Windsor Court Hotel in New Orleans, Louisiana. The hotel was built in 1984 and is known for its Anglophilic styling.

Anatole Hotel 
Trammell Crow was the original developer of the Anatole Hotel in 1979. At the time it was the largest hotel in North Texas, with 900 rooms. A second tower was added in 1984 which added 720 rooms.

Dallas Market Center 
In March 2015, Crow Holdings paid $140 million to buy the Dallas Market Center complex, purchased from CNL Lifestyle Properties, Inc., which co-owned the property with Crow Holdings since 2005. Trammell Crow had first developed the market center in 1957.

Brussels International Trade Mart 
Trammell Crow developed the Brussels International Trade Mart in 1973, and opened it in 1975.

Affiliated companies

Lincoln Property Company 
In 1965, Trammell Crow and Mack Pogue founded Lincoln Property Company as a developer and manager of high-quality residential communities throughout the US. In 1977 Pogue purchased Trammell Crow’s share in the company.

Wyndham Hotel Corporation 
In 1981, Trammell Crow founded Wyndham Hotel Corporation. Wyndham merged with hotel REIT Patriot American Hospitality in 1998. Patriot was later converted from a REIT to a corporation and renamed Wyndham International. Blackstone acquired Wyndham International in 2005.

AvalonBay 
In 1993, Trammell Crow Residential spun off its Northeastern division to create Avalon Properties Inc, a REIT based in Wilton, Connecticut. Avalon acquired properties from TCR Midwest and TCR Pacific Northwest in 1997 and 1998, respectively. In 1998, Avalon merged with Bay Apartment Communities to create, AvalonBay Communities.  It was the first bi-coastal multifamily REIT and, as of 2020 it was the largest apartment REIT in the country by equity market capitalization.

Gables Residential Trust 
In 1993, TCR combined its Atlanta, Dallas and Houston divisions, as well as Nashville assets to form REIT Gables Residential Trust.  In 1998, it acquired TCR South Florida.  Gables Residential issued its IPO in 1994 Gables merged with Lion Gables Apartment Fund LP, in 2004, an investment fund managed by ING Clarion Partners and Lehman Brothers. It was then taken private under the name Lion Gables Apartment Fund LP. Clarion acquired Gables Residential in 2015.

Homegate Hospitality 
In 1996, Homegate Hospitality, Inc., an extended-stay hotel chain, was founded by TCR, Greystar Capital Partners, L.P. and Crow Investment Trust, the real estate investment arm of the Crow Family. In 1997, lodging company Prime Hospitality Corp. acquired Homegate Hospitality, Inc.

Mergers, acquisitions and sponsorships 
In 1997, BRE Properties acquired the western US assets and operations of TCR, effectively merging TCR-West and BRE to create a REIT with a  portfolio of over 21,000 units. In 1997, AMLI Residential acquired a percentage of TCR Midwest while Avalon acquired the remaining portion. In 1998, Merry Land & Investment Co., a publicly held REIT, acquired 13 apartment communities containing over 3,900 units from TCR North Florida.

In 2002 Crow Holdings Industrial Trust was sold as a portfolio of properties to Clarion, which formed the beginnings of the Lion Industrial Trust.

In 2010 Crow Holdings formed the Mill Creek Residential Trust, LLC to develop, operate and buy apartments in major US metropolitan areas. In 2018 the Arizona State Retirement System purchased a 50% stake in Mill Creek Residential Trust.

References

External links

Companies based in Dallas